Wesley United Methodist Church is a common name.  It can refer to several churches in the United States:

 Wesley United Methodist Church (Worcester, Massachusetts)
 Wesley United Methodist Church (Minneapolis, Minnesota)
 Wesley United Methodist Church (Sikeston, Missouri)
 Wesley United Methodist Church (Bryan, Ohio)
 Wesley United Methodist Church (El Reno, Oklahoma)
 Wesley United Methodist Church (Bryan, Texas)
 Wesley United Methodist Church (Austin, Texas)
 Wesley United Methodist Church (Reynolds Store, Virginia)
 Wesley United Methodist Church (Olongapo City, Philippines)

See also
 Wesley Church (disambiguation)
 Wesley Methodist Church (disambiguation)